Zodarion costapratae is a spider species found in Portugal.

See also 
 List of Zodariidae species

References

External links 

costapratae
Spiders of Europe
Fauna of Portugal
Spiders described in 2011